Arethas is the Greek form of the Arab name al-Harith ( "al-Ḥārith"). It can refer to:

 Arethas (martyr) (died 523), Arab Christian martyr in Yemen
 Al-Harith ibn Jabalah, Ghassanid king (r. 528–569)
 Arethas of Caesarea (fl. 10th-century), Byzantine scholar and archbishop of Caesarea (modern Kayseri, Turkey)

See also
 Aretas (disambiguation)